Transjugular intrahepatic portosystemic shunt (TIPS or TIPSS) is an artificial channel within the liver that establishes communication between the inflow portal vein and the outflow hepatic vein. It is used to treat portal hypertension (which is often due to liver cirrhosis) which frequently leads to intestinal bleeding, life-threatening esophageal bleeding (esophageal varices) and the buildup of fluid within the abdomen (ascites).

An interventional radiologist creates the shunt using an image-guided endovascular (via the blood vessels) approach, with the jugular vein as the usual entry site.

The procedure was first described by Josef Rösch in 1969 at Oregon Health and Science University. It was first used in a human patient by Dr. Ronald Colapinto, of the University of Toronto, in 1982, but did not become reproducibly successful until the development of endovascular stents in 1985. In 1988 the first successful TIPS was realized by M. Rössle, G.M. Richter, G. Nöldge and J. Palmaz at the University of Freiburg. The procedure has since become widely accepted as the preferred method for treating portal hypertension that is refractory to medical therapy, replacing the surgical portocaval shunt in that role.

Medical uses
TIPS is a life-saving procedure in bleeding from esophageal or gastric varices. A randomized study showed that the survival is better if the procedure is done within 72 hours after bleeding. TIPS has shown some promise for people with hepatorenal syndrome. It may also help with ascites.

Complications
Severe procedural complications during a TIPS procedure, including catastrophic bleeding or direct liver injury, are relatively uncommon. In the hands of an experienced physician, operative mortality is less than 1%. On the other hand, up to 25% of patients who undergo TIPS will experience transient post-operative hepatic encephalopathy caused by increased porto-systemic passage of nitrogen from the gut.

A less common, but more serious complication, is hepatic ischemia causing acute liver failure. While healthy livers are predominantly oxygenated by portal blood supply, long-standing portal hypertension results in compensatory hypertrophy of and increased reliance on the hepatic artery for oxygenation. Thus, in people with advanced liver disease the shunting of portal blood away from hepatocytes is usually well tolerated. However, in some cases suddenly shunting portal blood flow away from the liver may result in acute liver failure secondary to hepatic ischemia. Acute hepatic dysfunction after TIPS may require emergent closure of the shunt.

A rare but serious complication is persistent TIPS infection, also known as endotipsitis.

Lastly, the TIPS may become blocked by a blood clot or in-growth of endothelial cells and no longer function. This has been significantly reduced with the use of polytetrafluoroethylene (PTFE)–covered stents.

Mechanism of action
Portal hypertension, an important consequence of liver disease, results in the development of significant collateral circulation between the portal system and systemic venous drainage (porto-caval circulation). Portal venous congestion causes venous blood leaving the stomach and intestines to be diverted along auxiliary routes of lesser resistance in order to drain to systemic circulation. With time, the small vessels that comprise a collateral path for porto-caval circulation become engorged and dilated. These vessels are fragile and often hemorrhage into the GI tract. (See esophageal, gastric, rectal varices).

A TIPS procedure decreases the effective vascular resistance of the liver through the creation of an alternative pathway for portal venous circulation. By creating a shunt from the portal vein to the hepatic vein, this intervention allows portal blood an alternative avenue for draining into systemic circulation. In bypassing the flow-resistant liver, the net result is a reduced pressure drop across the liver and a decreased portal venous pressure. Decreased portal venous pressure in turn lessens congestive pressures along veins in the intestine so that future bleeding is less likely to occur.  The reduced pressure also makes less fluid develop, although this benefit may take weeks or months to occur.

Implantation

Transjugular intrahepatic portosystemic shunts are typically placed by an interventional radiologist under fluoroscopic guidance. Access to the liver is gained, as the name 'transjugular' suggests, via the internal jugular vein in the neck.  Once access to the jugular vein is confirmed, a guidewire and introducer sheath are typically placed to facilitate the shunt's placement.  This enables the interventional radiologist to gain access to the patient's hepatic vein by traveling from the superior vena cava into the inferior vena cava and finally the hepatic vein.  Once the catheter is in the hepatic vein, a wedge pressure is obtained to calculate the pressure gradient in the liver. Following this, carbon dioxide is injected to locate the portal vein. Then, a special needle known as a Colapinto is advanced through the liver parenchyma to connect the hepatic vein to the large portal vein, near the center of the liver.  The channel for the shunt is next created by inflating an angioplasty balloon within the liver along the tract created by the needle.  The shunt is completed by placing a special mesh tube known as a stent or endograft to maintain the tract between the higher-pressure portal vein and the lower-pressure hepatic vein.  After the procedure, fluoroscopic images are made to show placement. Pressure in the portal vein and inferior vena cava are often measured.

See also
 Balloon-occluded retrograde transvenous obliteration
 Distal splenorenal shunt procedure
 Gastric antral vascular ectasia
 Portal venous system

References

External links
 RadiologyInfo: Transjugular Intrahepatic Portosystemic Shunt (TIPS)
 Transjugular Intrahepatic Portosystemic Shunt - eMedicine.com.

Accessory digestive gland surgery
Hepatology
Implants (medicine)
Vascular surgery
Interventional radiology